Oppenheimer Stadium is a football (soccer) stadium in Orkney, South Africa. It currently has a capacity of 23,000, but it has increased to 40,000 during the 2010 Football World Cup.

The existing earth embankments around the stadium will be enlarged by creating a new reinforced concrete structure at the rear and building upwards.

The size of the arena will be further increased by the removal of the athletics track, enabling in front of the first row of seats and creating girth for further rows to be installed.

Then, the existing roof of the main stand will be removed and replaced by a new roof covering the extended main stand.

It was named after Harry Oppenheimer, son of Ernest Oppenheimer and former chairman of De Beers.

On 13 January 1991, during a pre-season "friendly" football match between Kaizer Chiefs and Orlando Pirates, there was a stampede with 42 deaths, the Oppenheimer Stadium Disaster, the second worst sporting incident in South Africa.

The stadium has since been vandalized and is in no condition to hold any sporting event. 

Soccer venues in South Africa
Sports venues in North West (South African province)